Yashua Klos (born 1977) is an American visual artist best known for his innovative large-scale collage works which address issues of identity, race, memory and community.

Early life and education 
Klos was born in Chicago, Illinois, where he grew up on Chicago's South Side and was raised by his single mother. In 2000, he earned his Bachelor of Fine Arts degree at Northern Illinois University. Klos then studied abroad in France, where he investigated Renaissance painting techniques at L'Atelier Neo Medici in 2002. By 2009, he earned a Master of Fine Arts degree at Hunter College.

Art 
Klos's work is influenced by his childhood growing up on Chicago's South Side. His work commonly explores themes surrounding African-American identity in contemporary society. Through his large-scale collages, Klos challenges notions of marginalization, masculinity, and urban mythology. He paints portraits of people from Chicago's South Side, highlighting narratives of suppression, denial, and pain associated with the vulnerability experienced in black communities. There was a "stoicism" among the "black folks" Klos witnessed, an element he attempts to unpack by studying the behavioral nature of adapting and thriving. Overall, he challenges conventions often attached to the African-American man.

Klos is represented by Jack Tilton Gallery.

Printmaking 

In his earlier works, Klos was known for printing giant woodcuts on large stretches of muslin. His interest in the technique grew out of the many African-American activists who employed it during the mid-20th century, such as Charles White, Elizabeth Catlett, and Emily Douglas. By cutting and etching using a series of erratic, jagged marks, he imitates this "kinetic devotion to image-making" that grounds this element of humanity he desires to achieve.

Collage 

Klos's collages derive from his practice as a printmaker. Using a personalized approach, he creates swatches and samples of textures by hand-carving and inking woodblock prints to create a library of source material. By piecing and arranging a selection of patterns, they are layered on top of a pencil blueprint to create a complete portrait. His ideas of memory and distortion are demonstrated by the manifestation of fractured impressions and angled perspectives. Klos views collage as more than just a technique, but more a "metaphor for the fragmentation of African-American identity".

Sculpture 

Klos references earthly materials, physical mediums he views as strong yet vulnerable over the passage of time. He associates timelessness to ancient monuments, a concept he applies to his sculptures to communicate the "monumentality of a culture's identity and relationship to time". Often, he incorporates materials leftover from urban renewal, such as milk crates, bricks, and wooden beams. The use of these mediums suggest Klos' desire to construct an identity relevant to his background.

Selected exhibitions 
 2018: Go Figure, The Pizzuti Collection, Columbus, OH
 2017: Everyday Anomaly, WHATIFTHEWORLD, Cape Town, South Africa
 2017: Art on the Vine, presented by The Agora Culture, Edgartown, MA
 2017: Face to Face: Los Angeles Collects Portraiture, California African American Museum, Los Angeles, CA
 2017: Give Us the Vote, ArtsWestchester, White Plains, NY
 2016: Black Pulp!, The International Print Center, New York, NY
 2016, September: Galerie Anne DeVillepoix, Blank Black, Paris, France
 2016, September: Papillon Art, Yashua Klos: How to Hide in the Wind, Los Angeles CA
 2015: To Be Young, Gifted, and Black, curated by Hank Willis Thomas, Goodman Gallery, Johannesburg, South Africa
 2015: Broken English, curated by Kim Stern, Tyburn Gallery, London, UK
 2015, September: Jack Tilton Gallery, As Below, So Above, New York, NY
 2014, February: Carnegie Mellon University, Draw 2014 Symposium, Pittsburgh, PA
 2014, November: Opa Locka ARC, In Plain Sight, Opa-Locka, FL
 2013, March: Jack Tilton Gallery, We Come Undone, New York, NY
 2012, October: Memphis College of Art, Singular Masses, Memphis, TN
 2012: Weatherspoon Museum, Art on Paper, Greensboro, NC
 2012, November: Studio Museum in Harlem, Fore, New York, NY
 2012: Dodge Gallery, Bigger Than Shadows, New York NY
 2011, June: Kravetz Wehby, Paperwork, New York, NY
 2010, July: Scaramouche Gallery, Lush Life, New York, NY
 2010, September: Tilton Gallery, ELSE, New York, NY
 2010, October: Catskill Art Society, Utopia and Wallpaper, Livingston Manor, NY
 2009, January: Museum of Science and Industry, Black Creativity 09, Chicago, IL
 2009, June: Hunterdon Museum of Art, Up and Coming, Clinton, NJ
 2008, February: Rush Arts Gallery, Garveyism, New York, NY
 2008, August: Port Authority Bus Terminal, The Mt. Rushmore Drawings, New York NY
 2006, February: The Abrons Art Center, Inner Visions, New York, NY
 2006, September: Deitch Projects, Deitch Art Parade, New York, NY

Klos is represented by Tilton Gallery (New York) and Galerie Anne de Villepoix (Paris).

Awards and residencies 
 NYFA Grant, 2015
 Joan Mitchell Fellowship, 2014
 The Skowhegan School of Painting and Sculpture, 2005
 Bemis Center for Contemporary Arts
 The Vermont Studio Center

Teaching 
Yashua Klos teaches regularly at Hunter College and Parson's

References

External links 
 http://www.yashuaklos.net/

1977 births
Living people
American multimedia artists